Philharmonics is the debut studio album by Danish singer-songwriter Agnes Obel. It was released on 17 September 2010 by PIAS. The album received positive reviews from both Danish and international music critics. Philharmonics peaked at number one in Denmark and Belgium, and charted inside the top ten in France and the Netherlands. The album has sold 450,000 copies in Europe. The album includes the singles "Riverside", "Just So", and "Brother Sparrow".

Composition 
Obel cited Erik Satie as an influence on many of the compositions: "I am a huge fan of his work on silences. I like also his uses of repetitive sequences, almost hypnotic. That gives extremely strong pieces, calms and powerful at the same time."

According to the singer, "The texts come from the melody, its atmosphere, the piano (…) They also speak about the uncertainty of the future and undoubtedly of the feeling of loneliness, but without the anger which, for me, is not a musical engine".

Philharmonicss lyrics are simple, mysterious, and allegoric. Philippe Cornet says, "The texts in question sound like metaphors of love, death, impetuosities of nature or sudden rustles of the city."

Philharmonics contains three titles that are purely instrumental: "Falling, Catching", "Louretta" and "Wallflower".

Promotion 
"Just So" was used in a Deutsche Telekom commercial in Germany. Three songs from the album were on the soundtrack of the 2009 film Submarino. "Riverside" was used in the episode "Not Responsible" of Grey's Anatomy and in episode 12 of the second season of Offspring. It was again played in the episode "What Are You Doing Here, Ho-Bag?" from The CW hit series Ringer.

The ABC television show Revenge have used two songs from this album in their show. "Avenue" was played in the episode "Trust" and "Riverside" was played in the episode entitled "Duplicity".

The German director Markus Thoess used a couple of songs for the documentary Tod einer Scientologin - (Death of a Scientologist) that was broadcast in 2012 on NDR and Feb 2013 in ARD, first German Channel.

The first episode of the 2020 Danish mini-series Efterforskningen (The Investigation), used both "Riverside" and the John Cale cover "Close Watch".

Reception

Critical reception 
Philharmonics earned generally positive reviews with, for example, James Skinner from the BBC saying that "the compositions... are slow, sombre, sepulchral even, but not without a sense of occasionally singular beauty".

In the French cultural magazine Les Inrockuptibles, Johanna Seban speaks about a "disarming purity" and states, "There is, in these deeply melancholic ballads, the clearness and reassuring nobility of bedside discs."

In MusicOMH, Ben Edgell wrote, "Obel sings with a hushed and tender grace that waxes wistful and serene over yearning cello, harp, and piano vignettes. She's a fey siren, with a dusky, near-whispered vocal that speaks to Ane Brun or Eva Cassidy." In November 2011, she won five prizes at the Danish Music Awards for her album Philharmonics. She won Best Album of the Year, Best Pop Release of the Year, Best Debut Artist of the Year, Best Female Artist of the Year, and Best Songwriter of the Year.

Commercial performance 
The album entered the charts at number four in Denmark on 15 October 2010. On its thirteenth week on the chart, on 7 January 2011, the album rose to number one and spent seven consecutive weeks at number one. It has since been certified six-times platinum by the International Federation of the Phonographic Industry (IFPI) for sales of 120,000 units. Philharmonics peaked at number one in France. It has since been certified platinum by the Syndicat National de l'Édition Phonographique (SNEP) for sales of 100,000 units. It also peaked at number one on the Belgian Albums Chart in Wallonia. Philharmonics has since been certified gold by the Belgian Entertainment Association (BEA) for sales of 10,000 units. In October 2011, it was awarded a diamond certification from the Independent Music Companies Association (IMPALA), which indicated sales in excess of 200,000 copies throughout Europe.

Track listing

Charts

Weekly charts

Year-end charts

Certifications

Release history

References 

2010 albums
PIAS Recordings albums
Agnes Obel albums
European Border Breakers Award-winning albums